Poochera is a small grain belt town 60 km north-west of Streaky Bay on the Eyre Peninsula, South Australia.

The township of Poochera was not surveyed until 1920, and its name is thought to be taken from the name of King Poojeri, a local aboriginal who died in 1917. A nearby hill is also named Poochera, possibly stemming from the same origin.

The town had a school which opened in 1920, but closed its doors in 1976.

Poochera is the centrepoint of a large agricultural area, the town itself being a strategic grain exchange point for the region's farmers, who specialise in cereal crops and sheep.

The town is 53 km away from the Gawler Ranges, and is commonly used as a stop off by tourists, who have access to a hotel and caravan park.

Poochera, however, is probably best noted for its nearby colonies of dinosaur ant (Nothomyrmecia macrops), a rare, primitive species of ant that has attracted entomologists and evolutionary biologists from around the world.

Apart from the Poochera Hotel and Caravan Park, the town is served by a roadhouse where most general supplies can be purchased.

The 2016 Australian census which was conducted in August 2016 reports that Poochera had a population of 59 people.

Poochera is located within the federal division of Grey, the state electoral district of Flinders and the local government area of the District Council of Streaky Bay.

Notes and references

External links
Council Page
Nullabornet Infopage

Towns in South Australia
Eyre Peninsula